Heart 2 Heart is the seventh studio album by Filipino R&B singer Kyla, released in August 2008 by EMI Music Philippines and Poly East Records in CD and cassette format and digitally on June 11, 2009. Like the previous album Heartfelt, it also consists mostly of covers.

The album was produced by Chito Ilagan and Jay R Sillona with his team Smash Brothaz, and co-produced by Kyla herself. Heart 2 Heart also includes original OPM materials like "You Make Me Feel" and "Back In Time", both of which Kyla wrote with Jay R.

The single "Back In Time" won several awards including "OPM Song Of The Year" at the RX 93.1 Awards, "Best Collaboration Award" at the Wave 89.1 Urban Music Awards and in 2010 for "Favorite Song" at the MYX Music Awards.

Track listing
All tracks were produced by Chito Ilagan except for Back In Time produced by Jay R and Smash Brothaz.

Disc 2: Heart 2 Heart (Minus One)

Awards
Awit Awards
Best Collaboration: "Back In Time" with Jay R
Best R&B: You Make Me Feel
Best Musical Arrangement: Ribbon In The Sky (Musical Arranger: Bobby Velasco)
Best Vocal Arrangement: Ribbon In The Sky (Vocal Arranger : Arnie Mendaros)
MYX Music Awards: 
Favorite Song: "Back in Time" with Jay R
Favorite Mellow Video: Old Friend 
Favorite Female Artist (nominated)
Favorite Collaboration (with Jay-R) (nominated)
Favorite Remake -Heart 2 Heart (nominated)
RX 93.1 Awards: 
OPM Song of the Year: "Back In Time" (feat Jay R) 
 Wave 89.1 Urban Music Awards
Best Collaboration: "Back in Time" with Jay-R
1st Star Awards for Music
Best R&B album

Personnel
Adapted from the album credits.

 Ramon Chuaying - executive producer
 Chito Ilagan - album producer
 Jay R Sillona - producer, arranger
 Smash Brothaz - producer, arranger
 Kyla - co-producer
 Ethel Cachapero - domestic label manager
 Arleen Zabala - assistant domestic label manager
 Willie A. Monzon - sleeve design and art direction
 Mark Nicdao - photography
 Mervin Lazaro - stylist
 Christine Bunyi aka TINTIN - hair & make-up artist
 Efren San Pedro - recording engineer
 Nikki Cunanan - mixing engineer
 Kyla - vocals, background vocals
 Arnie Mendaros - vocal arranger, vocal coach
 Jay R Sillona - arranger, vocals
 Smash Brothaz - arranger
 Albert Tamayo - arranger
 Mon Faustino - arranger
 Jimmy Antiporda - arranger
 Bimbo Yance - arranger
 Bobby Velasco - arranger
 Karel Honasan - arranger
 Toto Sorioso - arranger
 Kakoi Legaspi - arranger, harmonica
 Francis De Leon - saxophone
 Ric Mercado - guitars
 Kettle Mata - guitars
 Meong Pacana - bass
 Boyet Aquino - drums
 Jay Durias - keyboards
 Michael Alba - percussions

References

2008 debut albums
Kyla albums